Forever in Your Mind (FIYM) is an American pop boy band formed in 2013, consisting of Emery Kelly, Ricky Garcia, and Liam Attridge. Their debut extended play, FIYM, was released through Hollywood Records on July 1, 2016.

History

2013–2015: Formation
In 2013, when they were 16 and 14 years old, Emery Kelly (as a solo artist) and Ricky Garcia (as part of a group) auditioned for season 3 of The X-Factor. They were both eliminated during the boot camp round, but judge Simon Cowell asked Kelly and Garcia to remain on the show, teaming them with Garcia's group member Jon Klaasen to form a trio he named Forever in Your Mind. They sang a cover of the Jonas Brothers's "Lovebug," and were the last contestants cut before the final sixteen. On November 7, 2013, their first music video, "She Lights the World," premiered on Just Jared Jr. The song was written by Charlie Midnight and Allen Copeland.

In June 2014, Klaasen left the band and was replaced the following month by Kelly's cousin, Liam Attridge.

Forever in Your Mind released the song "Sweet Little Something" on March 12, 2015; a second version featuring Jordyn Jones was released three days later, on March 15. The band signed to Hollywood Records in November 2015, and released a music video for their holiday-themed song, "Wrapped Up for Christmas," in December 2015.

2016: FIYM
Following the High School Musical 10-year anniversary special that aired on Disney Channel on January 20, 2016, Forever in Your Mind created a three-minute medley of songs from the movie. They later recorded a medley of five songs from Disney Channel films ("Wildside" from Adventures in Babysitting, "This Is Me" from Camp Rock, "Cruisin' for a Bruisin'" from Teen Beach Movie, "Rotten to the Core" from Descendants, and "Breaking Free" from High School Musical), which was included on the 2016 soundtrack, Your Favorite Songs from 100 Disney Channel Original Movies. Other cover versions of songs the band has recorded include Taylor Swift's "Wildest Dreams," the DNCE single "Cake by the Ocean," and Bruno Mars' "Uptown Funk".

On April 29, 2016, the group released "Hurricane," the first single from their upcoming extended play. They co-wrote the song with Doug Rockwell and Dustin Atlas. It premiered on Radio Disney three days earlier. On June 30, 2016, Teen Vogue premiered the music video for the EP's second single, "Enough About Me," which the group co-wrote with Grammy certified songwriter Bill Grainer and Doug Rockwell. On July 1, 2016, Forever in Your Mind released their debut EP, FIYM.

2017–2018: Euphoric
Forever in Your Mind released the non-album single, "Smooth," on April 28, 2017, after having promoted their debut EP throughout much of 2016. The single release also featured the B-side track, "Missing," a pop ballad that laments a relationship fractured beyond repair.

Toward the end of 2017, the band announced the upcoming release of their latest EP, Euphoric, preceded by its lead single, "Rabbit Hole". The EP became available for pre-order on December 15, and was fully released on January 12, 2018.

On October 28, 2018, Forever in your Mind released their single "Let Go," their first musical release since Euphoric.

Members 
Current
 Emery Kelly – vocals (2013–present)
 Ricky Garcia – vocals (2013–present)
 Liam Attridge – vocals (2014–present)

Former
Jon Klaasen – vocals (2013–2014)

Performances
Forever in Your Mind has performed live with Demi Lovato, Fifth Harmony, Jesse McCartney, and Bea Miller, touring North America as a part of DigiTour in 2015. The band presented an award on stage at the 2016 Radio Disney Music Awards on May 1, 2016, and made their national television debut in a performance on ABC's Good Morning America on July 4, 2016. In 2016, the band went on tour with Olivia Holt, Ryland Lynch, and Isac Elliot. The band also performed with Holt at the 2016 TJ Martell Family Foundation Day in Los Angeles on October 9, 2016. Their Euphoric tour concluded on July 20, 2018.

Television
Garcia made a guest appearance in Girl Meets World, but is known for his role as Naldo on the Disney Channel comedy series, Best Friends Whenever, which premiered on June 26, 2015. Kelly made an appearance on the show's first episode. The Forever in Your Mind song "Whenever" is the theme song on Best Friends Whenever, and their cover of KC and the Sunshine Band's "(Shake, Shake, Shake) Shake Your Booty" was in the seventh episode of the show, a 1970s flashback, that aired on August 23, 2015.

In August 2016, it was announced that Disney Channel greenlit a supernatural comedy pilot starring Garcia, Kelly, and Attridge, titled Forever Boys. The series, directed by Adam Stein, would have followed three brothers bitten by a vampire during their first concert in 1957. After keeping their vampire identities a secret for over half a century, a music producer convinced them to reemerge as a vampire boy band. If picked up, the series would have debuted in 2017. On January 12, 2018, Forever in Your Mind revealed that the show was not picked up.

Kelly played Lucas Mendoza on the Netflix series, Alexa & Katie, from 2018 to 2020. The first season was released on March 23, 2018, with the second season being released later that year, on December 26. In season 2, Garcia and Attridge appeared in several episodes as Cameron and Steve, two inexperienced musicians Lucas auditioned to be part of his band. The band performed in the season two finale episode.

Discography

Extended plays

Singles

Other appearances

References

External links
 

Musical groups established in 2013
Musical groups from Los Angeles
American pop music groups
American boy bands
Vocal trios
21st-century American musicians
Hollywood Records artists
The X Factor (American TV series) contestants
2013 establishments in California